History of violence may refer to:

 The historical perspective on violence
 A History of Violence, a 2005 American crime thriller film directed by David Cronenberg
 A History of Violence (comics), a 1997 graphic novel written by John Wagner and illustrated by Vince Locke
 A History of Violence (album), the 2008 album by hip-hop group Jedi Mind Tricks
 "History of Violence" (song), a song recorded by Canadian rock band Theory of a Deadman
 Overclocked: A History of Violence, a 2008 video game
 History of Violence (novel), a 2016 novel by Édouard Louis